The Pan-African Ornithological Congress (PAOC) is a regular conference on African ornithology, usually held every four years at an African venue.  Its geographic scope is:
"...the entire continent from North Africa to the Cape of Good Hope, and east to the Suez Canal and Red Sea; the Cape Verde, Madeira and Canary islands; also isolated Atlantic Oceanic islands nearer Africa than South America, Antarctic islands south of Africa and the African-facing coast of Antarctica, the Seychelles, Comoros, Socotra, Mascarene Islands and Madagascar. All continental shelf islands (e.g. Zanzibar, Fernando Po — now Bioko) are considered areas of interest, as are areas of provenance and intervening routes of migratory birds that visit Africa."

Its aims and purposes are, with regard to African birds, to:
 Further their study
 Promote their preservation as an integral part of African heritage
 Foster their appreciation and discussion in relation to man, and
 Disseminate information about them through international meetings (Congresses) and publications (Proceedings)

The constitution also states:
"Of vital importance to this scientific and educational organisation is the opportunity for free and open discussion of African avian biology, birds and their relations to man, and man’s effects on bird populations."

History
The concept of holding a conference focussing on the African avifauna originated in an invitation by Cecily Niven, then President of the South African Ornithological Society (SAOS, later BirdLife South Africa), to the 11th International Ornithological Congress (IOC), in Basel, Switzerland in 1954, to hold the 12th IOC in South Africa.  Although the offer was not taken up at the time, it stimulated discussion about holding an independent conference on African birds, leading to the first PAOC in Livingstone, Northern Rhodesia, in 1957.

The first three congresses took place in southern Africa under the auspices of the SAOS, with the third (in Kruger National Park) largely organised by the Percy FitzPatrick Institute.  Because of the political atmosphere pertaining to apartheid in South Africa at the time, no indigenous Africans participated in those meetings.

At the 16th IOC in Canberra, Australia, in 1974, several ornithologists suggested that the next PAOC should be held outside southern Africa, in order to give it a truly Pan-African dimension, and to encourage greater participation from other parts of Africa, including by indigenous Africans.  Although PAOC 4 was due to be held in Kenya, the political atmosphere meant that many ornithologists from southern Africa would be unable to attend. Consequently, the meeting was moved to the Seychelles, making it the first to be held outside southern Africa, even though it did not take place on the African continent.

Subsequent congresses have been held throughout Africa.  In 1988 PAOC became a permanent institution with the adoption of a constitution at PAOC 7 in Nairobi.  The first francophone venue was Bujumbura, Burundi, in 1992, and the first North African venue the island of Djerba, Tunisia, in 2004.  Subjects covered by the published proceedings show that, from the first to the eleventh congresses the number of papers on bird conservation topics increased considerably.

List of congresses
 1957 – Livingstone, Northern Rhodesia
 1964 – Pietermaritzburg, South Africa
 1969 – Kruger National Park, South Africa
 1976 – Mahé, Seychelles
 1980 – Lilongwe, Malawi
 1985 – Francistown, Botswana
 1988 – Nairobi, Kenya
 1992 – Bujumbura, Burundi
 1996 – Accra, Ghana
 2000 – Kampala, Uganda
 2004 – Djerba, Tunisia
 2008 – Rawsonville, South Africa
 2012 – Arusha, Tanzania
 2016 – Dakar, Senegal
2021 – Victoria Falls, Zimbabwe

Congress Proceedings
 Rowan MK (ed) 1959. Proceedings of the First Pan-African Ornithological Congress, Livingstone, Southern Rhodesia, 15–19 July 1957. Ostrich Supplement 3.
 Broekhuysen GJ (ed) 1966. Proceedings of the Second Pan-African Ornithological Congress, Pietermaritzburg, Natal, 21–25 September 1964. Ostrich Supplement 6.
 Maclean GL (ed) 1971. Proceedings of the Third Pan-African Ornithological Congress, Pretoriuskop, Kruger National Park, 15–19 September 1969. Ostrich Supplement 8.
 Johnson DN (ed) 1980. Proceedings of the Fourth Pan-African Ornithological Congress, Mahé, Seychelles, 6–13 November 1976. Southern African Ornithological Society, Johannesburg, South Africa.
 Ledger JA (ed) 1984. Proceedings of the Fifth Pan-African Ornithological Congress, Lilongwe, Malawi, 1980. Southern African Ornithological Society, Johannesburg, South Africa.
 Backhurst GC (ed) 1988. Proceedings of the Sixth Pan-African Ornithological Congress, Francistown (Botswana) 1985. Sixth PAOC Committee, Nairobi, Kenya.
 Bennun L (ed) 1992. Proceedings of the Seventh Pan-African Ornithological Congress, Nairobi (Kenya) 1988. Seventh PAOC Committee, Nairobi, Kenya.
 Wilson RT (ed) 1993. Proceedings of the Eighth Pan-African Ornithological Congress, Bujumbura, Burundi, 30 September–5 October 1992. Koninklijk Museum voor Midden-Afrika Tervuren, Belgium, Annalen (Zoologische Wetenschappen) 268.
 Craig AJFK and Gordon C (eds) 2000. Proceedings of the Ninth Pan-African Ornithological Congress, Accra, Ghana, 1–7 December 1996. Ostrich 71(1–2).
 Lens L (ed) 2001. Proceedings of the Tenth Pan-African Ornithological Congress, Kampala, Uganda, 3–8 September 2000. Ostrich Supplement 15.
 Craig AJFK (ed) 2007. Proceedings of the 11th Pan-African Ornithological Congress, 2004. Ostrich 28(2): 115–553.
 Harebottle DM, Craig AJFK, Anderson MD, Rakotomanana H and Muchai (eds) 2009. Proceedings of the 12th Pan African Ornithological Congress, 2008. Cape Town, Animal Demography Unit.

References

Notes

Sources

External links
Pan-African Ornithological Congress website

Ornithological organizations
Non-profit organizations based in Africa
Biology conferences
.
Pan-African organizations
Research institutes in Africa
Scientific organizations established in 1957
1957 establishments in Africa